The Chiaramonti Caesar is one of the two accepted portraits of Julius Caesar from before the age of the Roman Empire, alongside the Tusculum portrait. The bust has influenced the iconography of Caesar and given the name to the Chiaramonti-Pisa type, one of the two main types of facial portraits that can be seen of Caesar in modern days.

The bust is part of the collection of the Vatican Museums.

See also
 Cultural depictions of Julius Caesar
 Julius Caesar (Andrea Ferrucci), an Italian Renaissance bust modeled on the Chiaramonti Caesar
 Arles bust, possible third lifelike Caesar portrait

References

External links

Archaeological discoveries in Italy
Busts of Julius Caesar